Isabel Cueto won in the final 7–6, 6–2 against Sandra Cecchini.

Seeds
A champion seed is indicated in bold text while text in italics indicates the round in which that seed was eliminated.

 n/a
  Barbara Paulus (quarterfinals)
  Isabel Cueto (champion)
  Sandra Cecchini (final)
  Judith Wiesner (second round)
  Regina Rajchrtová (quarterfinals)
  Patricia Tarabini (semifinals)
  Laura Garrone (quarterfinals)

Draw

External links
 1989 Estoril Open Draw

1989 Estoril Open